This is a list of the 25 members of the European Parliament for Portugal in the 1994 to 1999 session.

List

Portugal
List
1994-1999